The 2000 Adidas Open de Toulouse was a men's tennis tournament played on indoor hard courts in Toulouse, France that was part of the International Series 2 of the 2000 ATP Tour. It was the twentieth and final edition of the tournament and was held from 16 until 22 October 2000. First-seeded Àlex Corretja won the singles title.

Finals

Singles

 Àlex Corretja defeated  Carlos Moyá, 6–3, 6–2

Doubles

 Julien Boutter /  Fabrice Santoro defeated  Donald Johnson /  Piet Norval, 7–6(10–8), 4–6, 7–6(7–5)

References

External links
 ITF tournament edition details

Adidas Open de Toulouse
Grand Prix de Tennis de Toulouse
Grand Prix de Tennis de Toulouse
Grand Prix de Tennis de Toulouse